Sebastián Darío Navarro (born 24 February 1988) is an Argentine professional footballer who plays as a midfielder for Independiente Rivadavia.

Career
Navarro's career got underway with Argentine club Talleres, he spent five years with them and made thirty-nine appearances. However, his time with Talleres was largely spent out on loan with Navarro joining three different teams in four years. In 2011, Navarro joined Ferro Carril Oeste of Primera B Nacional and subsequently played thirty-two times and scored two goals. A year later he signed for Argentine Primera División side Argentinos Juniors, making his top-flight debut on 25 August 2012 versus Godoy Cruz. A final loan move followed in 2013 as he agreed to join Primera B Nacional's Aldosivi.

He participated in eighteen league fixtures before returning to Talleres. Upon arriving back to Talleres, Navarro left the club permanently to join former loan team Ferro Carril Oeste. He made thirty appearances in his first two seasons with Ferro, but again found himself out on loan on three separate occasions. He had two spells with Primera División side San Martín, one in 2015 and one in 2016–17. For the second part of 2016–17, Navarro joined another one of his former teams, Aldosivi, on loan. He was selected in ten league matches for Aldosivi as the club were relegated to Primera B Nacional.

In September 2017, Navarro joined Tristán Suárez of Primera B Metropolitana on a free transfer. He scored his first goal for his new team on 4 October versus Atlanta. The 200th appearance of Navarro's career arrived on 10 March 2018 during a draw with Deportivo Español. Three months later, Primera B Nacional side Instituto completed the signing of Navarro.

Career statistics
.

References

External links
 

1988 births
Living people
People from Río Negro Province
Argentine footballers
Association football midfielders
Torneo Argentino A players
Primera Nacional players
Argentine Primera División players
Primera B Metropolitana players
Talleres de Córdoba footballers
Ferro Carril Oeste footballers
Argentinos Juniors footballers
Aldosivi footballers
San Martín de San Juan footballers
CSyD Tristán Suárez footballers
Instituto footballers
All Boys footballers
Independiente Rivadavia footballers